Beings is the third studio album by British indie band Lanterns on the Lake. It was released 13 November 2015 under Bella Union.

The album was met with praise from critics upon its release, earning a score of 79/100 on review aggregate site Metacritic, indicating "Generally favorable reviews." Music critic Marcy Donelson, writing for AllMusic, awarded the album a score of 4 out of 5 stars and praised opener "Of Dust and Matter" as sounding reminiscent of Siouxsie Sioux, concluding that the album "dwells in a cloudy blend of dreams and creeping nightmares, unsettling yet captivating." In a review written by Joe Goggins, DIY magazine likewise awarded the album 4 stars, singling out the title track as a "standout" and commented that the group "is virtually without equal."

The song "Through The Cellar Door" was used for the soundtrack of the Square Enix game Life Is Strange: Before the Storm

Track listing

Personnel
 Hazel Wilde - Vocals, Piano, Guitar
 Paul Gregory - Guitar, Engineering, Mixing, Production
 Angela Chan - Violin, Cello
 Bob Allan - Bass
 Oliver Ketteringham - Drums

Additional personnel
 Mandy Parnell - Mastering
 K Craig - Artwork
 Simon Dennis and Tim Hurst - Brass on 'I'll Stall Them'

References

2015 albums
Bella Union albums
Lanterns on the Lake albums